Peasants and Workers Party (KAE) was a political party in Greece. The party was allied with the Party of Democratic Socialism (KODISO), the party contested the 1981 parliamentary election on a joint ticket with KODISO. The KODISO-KAE ticket got 40,126 votes (0.71%). The alliance did however fare much better in the European Parliament election, where it got 241,666 votes (4.26%).

References

Defunct political parties in Greece